"Golden Brown" is a song by the English rock band the Stranglers released as a 7-inch single on EMI's Liberty label in 1982, noted for its distinctive harpsichord instrumentation. It was the second single released from the band's sixth studio album La folie (1981) and peaked at No. 2 in the UK Singles Chart, the band's highest ever placing in that chart. It has also been recorded by many other artists.

Composition
There is disagreement among experts as to which time signatures best represents parts of the song. The main body of the song has a triple metre waltz rhythm, with beats grouped in threes, but the instrumental parts add an extra beat to create a phrase of thirteen beats. The sheet music of "Golden Brown" is published in B-flat minor.

The music was largely written by keyboardist Dave Greenfield and drummer Jet Black, with lyrics by singer/guitarist Hugh Cornwell. The basis for the tune came from an unused part of "Second Coming", a track which featured on their previous album.

Lyrics
In his book The Stranglers Song by Song (2001), Hugh Cornwell states, Golden Brown' works on two levels. It's about heroin and also about a girl... both provided me with pleasurable times."

Release and reception
Originally featured on the group's album La folie, which was released in November 1981, and later on the US pressings of Feline (1983), "Golden Brown" was released as a single in January 1982, and was accompanied by a music video. It was a top 10 hit around the world. David Hamilton, disc jockey on the comparatively conservative BBC Radio 2, which was a middle-of-the-road (MOR) music radio station at that time, made the single his "record of the week".

The single reached No. 2 in the official UK Singles Chart in February 1982, remaining there for two weeks behind double A-sided record "Town Called Malice/Precious" by the Jam. In a 2017 interview for Dutch television station Top 2000 a gogo, Hugh Cornwell says he believes that the song would have got to Number 1 if bassist Jean-Jacques Burnel had not told the press that the song was about heroin, at which point broadcasters removed it from their playlists, prejudicing sales. "I would have waited till it got to Number 1 and then said it," he commented.

In 1995, Black, Burnel and Greenfield appeared with impressionist Rory Bremner on his satirical Christmas special performing a parody version of the song about future Prime Minister Gordon Brown, who was then Shadow Chancellor of the Exchequer.

It was also featured in the film Snatch (2000) and is included on its soundtrack album.

In a BBC Radio 2 listener poll of the nation's favourite singles to have peaked at number two, conducted in late 2012, "Golden Brown" ranked fifth behind "Vienna", "Fairytale of New York", "Sit Down" and "American Pie", and just ahead of "Waterloo Sunset" and "Penny Lane"/"Strawberry Fields Forever".

In January 2014, NME ranked the song at No. 488 on its list of "The 500 Greatest Songs of All Time".

Music video

The video for "Golden Brown" was directed by Lindsey Clennell. It depicts the band members both as explorers in an Arabian country in the 1920s and performers for a fictional "Radio Cairo".

In addition to the Pyramids, the video is intercut with stock footage of the Mir-i-Arab Madrasah in Bukhara, the Shah Mosque in Isfahan, the Great Sphinx, Feluccas sailing, Bedouins riding, and camel racing in the United Arab Emirates. The performance scenes were filmed in the Leighton House Museum in Holland Park, London, which was also used in the filming of the video for "Gold" by Spandau Ballet in 1983.

Track listing
Songs, lyrics and music by the Stranglers.

7-inch: Liberty / BP 407 (UK)
Side one
"Golden Brown" – 3:28

Side two
"Love 30" – 3:57

1991 7-inch: Epic / 656761 7 (UK)
Side one
"Golden Brown" – 3:29

Side two
"You" – 3:09

1991 Reissue – CD-Maxi: Epic / 656761 2 (UK)
"Golden Brown" – 3:31
"You" – 3:08
"Peaches" – 3:59
"Skin Deep (12-inch Version)" – 7:09

Charts

Weekly charts

Remix

Year-end charts

Certifications

Cover versions
In 1996 British hip hop group Kaleef's re-working of the song reached number 22 in the UK Charts. The following year, a cover version by soul singer Omar reached number 37. 

In 2020 British YouTuber and saxophonist Laurence Mason's cover of "Golden Brown", in the style of classical American jazz pianist Dave Brubeck, was viewed over a million times, leading to a commercial release via Amazon and iTunes, and as a vinyl single under the title "Take Vibe EP". The vinyl release stayed two weeks in the Official Vinyl Singles Chart's Top 40, peaking at No 24.

References

External links
Guitar Tablature
Golden Brown – The Story Behind the Song at Wow-Vinyl

1981 songs
1982 singles
Baroque pop songs
Liberty Records singles
Songs about heroin
Songs written by Jet Black
Songs written by Hugh Cornwell
Songs written by Jean-Jacques Burnel
Songs written by Dave Greenfield
The Stranglers songs